The Court of the Lord Lyon (the Lyon Court) is a standing court of law, based in New Register House in Edinburgh, which regulates heraldry in Scotland. The Lyon Court maintains the register of grants of arms, known as the Public Register of All Arms and Bearings in Scotland, as well as records of genealogies.

The Lyon Court is a public body, and the fees for grants of arms are paid to HM Treasury. It is headed by the Lord Lyon King of Arms, who must be legally qualified, as he has criminal jurisdiction in heraldic matters, and the court is fully integrated into the Scottish legal system, including having a dedicated prosecutor, known in Scotland as a procurator fiscal.

Its equivalent in England, Wales, and Northern Ireland, in terms of awarding arms, is the College of Arms, which is a royal corporation and not a court of law. The High Court of Chivalry is a civil court in England and Wales with jurisdiction over cases dealing with heraldry.

Remit and jurisdiction

Rights to arms and pedigree

The Lyon Court is directly responsible for the establishment of the rights to arms and pedigree. These can include the granting and regranting of armorial bearings by Letters Patent and various Birthbrieves, such as Diplomas of Nobility or of the Chiefship (Diploma Stemmatis). All of these actions must begin with a formal petition to the Court.

When sufficient evidence is attested to these rights, a judicial 'Interlocutor' or warrant will be issued by the Lord Lyon. This power of the Lord Lyon is derived from the monarch's royal prerogatives, which has been delegated to the office by law. The warrant will then authorise the Lyon Clerk and Keeper of the Records to prepare Letters Patent of the particular coat of arms or genealogy to be recorded in the: Public Register of All Arms and Bearings in Scotland or in the Public Register of All Genealogies and Birthbrieves in Scotland. The fees on all of these procedures are payable to the Exchequer. This is in contrast to the College of Arms in London, which, being an independent corporate body rather than a government department, reinvests all fees into itself.

Jurisdiction
The Court does not have universal jurisdiction and usually cannot accept applications (petitions) from abroad. According to the Court's official publication on its website, "the governing factor in the case of an original Grant of Arms is the domicile of the petitioner or the ownership of property in Scotland." In the second case, when the petitioner is not able to reside on the land, e.g. forestry land, the land is usually not able to bring the owner into the Lord Lyon's jurisdiction. One major exception from this principle applies to Commonwealth citizens if their local jurisdiction does not have its own heraldic office. "Commonwealth citizens, in particular those of Scottish descent - save for Canada and South Africa which have their own heraldic authorities - can apply to the Lord Lyon King of Arms."

Protection of arms

The penal aspect of the Court is concerned with the protection of the rights of both private individuals and of the Crown (in the form of the Scottish Government) in Scottish armorial bearings. The Lord Lyon also has control over messengers-at-arms, judicial officers responsible for serving documents and enforcing legal orders throughout Scotland.

The protection of the rights to arms is of signal importance because persons and corporation have paid fees to the Crown in return for exclusive rights to use those armorial bearings. A coat of arms can only belong to one particular person at a time. Without such protection, a coat of arms would be useless as a form of identification and worthless as a piece of private property. Furthermore, a misappropriation or unauthorised use (displaying or usurping) of a man's coat of arms is still considered a 'real injury' under Scottish common law.

Accordingly, an owner of a Scottish coat of arms may obtain a judicial order in the Court against anybody using his arms. The Crown and the public have an interest in these cases: the Crown has such an interest because, in Scotland, all fees on the registration of armorial bearings and pedigrees are payable to HM Treasury; the public has an interest in terms of the prevention of fraud and of the misappropriation of property. Individual coats of arms are also considered legal evidence, which means that they could be used in legal cases concerning the establishment of succession or identity.

Punishment
The Lyon Court, like all Scottish courts has a public prosecutor; styled 'Procurator Fiscal to Lyon Court', who is independently appointed by the Scottish Ministers. He raises proceedings, when necessary, against those who improperly usurp armorial bearings. The punishment for this offence is set out in several Scottish statutes acts. The court has the power to fine and to ensure items bearing the offending Arms are removed, destroyed or forfeited. In lieu of the financial interests of the Treasury, the High Court of Justiciary, will therefore sometimes regard cases brought by the Procurator Fiscal similarly to those of the Inland Revenue prosecution. Accordingly, an armorial offender was viewed as sternly as any other evading national taxation. This is in contrast to the Court of Chivalry in England, which has similar powers to the Lyon Court, but is a civil court, and has met only once in the last 230 years, in 1954, and is unlikely to sit again unless for a substantial cause.

Historically the punishment for the usurpation of arms were severe. In Acts dated 1592 and 1672, the Court was given the full power to fine and imprison offenders. In 1669 the Court was given the power to issue letters of horning. As well as the full power: to erase unwarranted arms, to 'dash them furth of' stained-glass windows and to break unwarranted seals. Where the cases involve forfeiture, the Court could grant a warrant for the seizure of movable goods and gear where unwarranted arms are found.

Judges and office holders

Officers of the Lyon Court
The only judge of the Lyon Court is the Lord Lyon King of Arms. The Lord Lyon is part of the judiciary of Scotland but is not subject to the discipline of the Lord President of the Court of Session. The Lord President's power of discipline are outlined in the Judiciary and Courts (Scotland) Act 2008 and the Courts Reform (Scotland) Act 2014 – the Lord Lyon is included in neither Act. The administration of the Court is also separate from the Scottish Courts and Tribunals Service.

The other officers of the Lyon Court are the Lyon Clerk and Keeper of the Records whose appointments are made by royal sign-manual, and the Procurator Fiscal who is independently appointed by the Scottish Ministers. Both officers are registered in The Edinburgh Gazette. There is also a Macer to the Lord Lyon who is a senior Messenger-at-Arms. The Macer appears when the Court is sitting in public and when Proclamations are made by the Lord Lyon.

Lord Lyon

The Lord Lyon King of Arms is the chief heraldic officer of Scotland and Great Officer of State and a judge in the judiciary of Scotland. The Lord Lyon's judicial duties concerning Scottish heraldic business and heraldic laws are conducted through the machinery of the Court of the Lord Lyon. The Court exercises both civil and penal jurisdiction under the old Common Law of Scotland and many Acts of Parliament.

The Lord Lyon has administrative functions, and is responsible for granting commissions to Messengers-at-Arms. The power to appoint the Lord Lyon is vested in the Monarch of the United Kingdom by section 3 of the Lyon King of Arms Act 1867.

Lyon Clerk and Keeper of Records
The Lyon Clerk is responsible for the administration of the Lyon Court. With every submission of application for a grant of arms, a matriculation of arms or the recording of genealogy must be made through the Lyon Clerk. This submission must be done either personally, by an intermediary agent or by correspondence, the Lyon Clerk is required to personally interview and reply to each applicant. As such the Lyon Clerk must take receipt of all documents and evidence submitted by the applicant in each case. Finally after the grant or matriculation has been made the Lyon Clerk must ensure that the resulting patent of arms is properly illuminated and emblazoned for the applicant and for the Lyon Court's register.

As Keeper of the Records, the Lyon Clerk is responsible for the maintenance of the Public Register of All Arms and Bearings in Scotland. This is done through the regular addition of new grants and matriculations. The Lyon Clerk must ensure that members of the public have access to the register by facilitating searches and studies of the records.

The Lyon Clerk's salary is paid for by the Crown. This has been the case since the Lyon King of Arms Act of 1867, when the whole of the Lyon Court and His Majesty's Officers of Arms were formally made into civil servants.

Procurator Fiscal
The Procurator Fiscal to the Court of the Lord Lyon is responsible for investigating complaints about usurpation of coats of arms (someone using arms to which they are not entitled) or the use of unregistered homemade coats of arms. The Procurator Fiscal can either issue a letter or warning, and where needed initiate a prosecution before the Lyon Court. The Procurator Fiscal undertakes these prosecutions on behalf of the Lord Advocate.

The Procurator Fiscal is legally qualified, must either be an Advocate or a solicitor, and is appointed by the Scottish Ministers. Until 2001 the Procurator Fiscal was appointed by the Lord Lyon, but in order to ensure compliance with Article 6 of the European Convention on Human Rights, the power to appoint the Procurator Fiscal was transferred to the Scottish Ministers by the Convention Rights (Compliance) Scotland Act 2001.

Current officers
The composition of the Lyon Court as of September 2021 is:

Officers of arms

HM Officers of Arms come under the control of the Lord Lyon and are members of the Royal Household in Scotland, however they are not officers of the Court of the Lord Lyon. They carry out many ceremonial duties in Scotland, such as on state and royal occasions and those in connection with Scottish public life. They may act as professional consultants in the realms of heraldry and genealogy, like an advocate or a law agent for members of the public and could appear for their clients before the Lyon Court as well as in the English Court of Chivalry.

Formerly there were: six Heralds of Arms and six Pursuivant of Arms in Ordinary (full-time members) and at various times any number of Extraordinary officers. In 1867 an Act of Parliament reduced the number of Ordinary officers to just three of each rank. The Act also set out their salaries and reaffirmed their rights and duties. These officers of arms wear the tabard of the Royal Arms of the United Kingdom, with the Scottish quarter taking precedence. They frequently appear in this uniform, when accompanying the monarch in royal ceremonies whilst he is in Scotland.

Other ceremonies in which the HM Officers of Arms take part include; the announcement of the dissolution of Parliament from the Mercat Cross on the Royal Mile in Edinburgh, the inauguration of the governors of Edinburgh Castle, and the ceremonial opening of the annual meeting of the General Assembly of the Church of Scotland.

Currently there are three Heralds of Arms in Ordinary and three Pursuivants of Arms in Ordinary. This brings the number of the Ordinary officers to six.

From time to time, others can be appointed temporarily or as a recognition of their work. These are styled Heralds or Pursuivants Extraordinary. Currently there are two Heralds of Arms Extraordinary and three Pursuivants of Arms Extraordinary.

In Scotland there are also four private pursuivants who are independent of Lyon Court. These officers are employed by Scottish nobles and chiefs and perform duties relating to genealogical, heraldic, and ceremonial matters of clan members.

His Majesty's Officers of Arms as of September 2022 are:

Vacant offices

Private Pursuivants

See also
Bureau of Heraldry (South Africa)
Canadian Heraldic Authority
College of Arms (London)
Council of Heraldry and Vexillology (Belgium)
Flemish Heraldic Council
Office of the Chief Herald of Ireland

References

Bibliography

Statutory Acts
Lyon King of Arms Act 1592
Lyon King of Arms Act 1669
Lyon King of Arms Act 1672
Lyon King of Arms Act 1867

External links 

 
 Procurator Fiscal to the Court of the Lord Lyon
 The Heraldry Society of Scotland
 Report on the Court of Lord Lyon (1822). Tenth Report of the commissioners appointed for inquiring into the Courts of Justice in Scotland. Parliamentary Papers, House of Commons and Command, Volume 8

 
Courts of Scotland
Heraldic authorities
Public bodies of the Scottish Government
1532 establishments in Scotland
Courts and tribunals established in 1532